Stadium is a digital television and internet sports network operated as a multi-platform sports network. Stadium includes a 24/7 linear feed distributed across both digital and broadcast platforms, as well as on-demand (VOD) digital content including additional live games and events. Stadium is a joint venture between Silver Chalice and Sinclair Broadcast Group. The network is headquartered at the United Center in Chicago, Illinois.

The service is distributed as an over-the-top streaming service through Stadium's website and other partners, digital subchannels on broadcast television stations.

History 
In March 2017, unconfirmed reports speculated that Sinclair was planning to shutter its sports unit, American Sports Network, and give its remaining sports rights to Campus Insiders. The Charleston Gazette-Mail, however, citing ASN employees, reported that the rumors of a complete shuttering were false, but that the division was planning to re-locate its headquarters, restructure its operations, and achieve "stronger, more diversified distribution." The original rumors were based upon reports of layoffs from ASN's current headquarters in West Palm Beach, connected to the planned re-location.

On April 13, 2017, Sinclair officially announced that ASN would be re-launched later in the year as part of a joint venture with Campus Insiders owner Silver Chalice (itself owned by the Chicago White Sox), and its online sports video service 120 Sports.  The new operation will be operated as linear and digital offerings; the linear service would utilize the syndication and broadcast network built out for ASN, while the digital platform would stream full-time online and through Twitter. 120 Sports would provide original studio and long-form programming to the venture.

On May 1, 2017, it was announced that the new joint venture would be known as Stadium. On June 1, 2017, it was reported that Stadium would officially launch around late-July 2017. The service officially launched on August 21, 2017.

In 2019, with Sinclair's expansions into regional sports networks via acquisitions of Fox Sports Networks, a minority stake in YES Network, and the establishment of Marquee Sports Network with the Chicago Cubs, Sinclair CEO Chris Ripley said of Stadium's role in the expanded sports offerings: "That will be our national play. I don’t see it competing head to head with FS1 or ESPN. It's not there yet with its maturity." 

In 2021, Stadium began to synergize with the rebranded Bally Sports, including co-producing an Opening Day launch special for the networks on April 1, and adopting its on-air graphics package for college sports broadcasts beginning in the 2021–22 academic season. The Fox College Sports cable channels were quietly rebranded as Stadium College Sports in June, and in 2022 Stadium began to produce the national studio show The Rally for the Bally Sports channels.

Distribution 
The service is distributed mainly via streaming television services and associated apps (including third-party services, as well as Sinclair's own Stirr service). The American Sports Network linear service, which was distributed as a digital subchannel network, transitioned to Stadium on September 6, 2017. The network has also reached deals for traditional cable distribution. Stadium also offers a subscription service, "Stadium Plus", which offers access to premium events and on-demand content (including commercial-free replays of broadcasts, and classic games).

In November 2017, Facebook acquired rights to 47 college basketball telecasts from Stadium, which stream exclusively on Facebook Watch and an associated Facebook page.

In May 2018, Stadium partnered with Twitch to stream its content on the service, as well as an exclusive Twitch Stadium 2 channel that features additional commentary and analysis.

Programming 
Stadium's college sports programming includes content from Conference USA,  the Mountain West Conference, the Patriot League, the Southern Conference, and the West Coast Conference.

Stadium's studio lineup includes:

The Territory - The Territory sets the editorial cycle for the day with a fast-paced, expansive look at the sports landscape, featuring news and storylines from coast-to-coast.

Sauce & Shram - Sauce & Shram showcases an irreverent and interactive conversation between Dave Ross and Tyler Jacobs along with user generated social media commentary and callers.

Emerge - Emerge spotlights the best high school talent across the country, featuring athlete-submitted training, game, and social content while also featuring interviews with players and coaches throughout prep sports.

Campus Insiders - Campus Insiders continues to focus on college conferences across the nation, including the ACC, Big Ten, Big 12, Conference USA, Mountain West, Pac-12, Patriot League, SEC, and the West Coast Conference. Each day, a different conference will be highlighted with exclusive interviews, Top 25 breakdowns, game picks and more.

The Rally: Gametime in America - Gametime in America sets the live sports scene as viewers will navigate in real time through the landscape of sports in America.

Indoor Football League, Stadium began broadcasting IFL games with the IFL Game of the Week on May 15, 2021.

College Football, Stadium has broadcast College Football since 2017. Currently games feature the Conference USA.

Stadium, as with other networks distributed by digital multicast networks, is required to preempt three hours of its weekly schedule for educational children's programming. With the exception of DragonflyTV, most of Stadium's educational shows are sports-related to minimize interruption; The Real Winning Edge, Sports Lab, Future Phenoms and Sports Stars of Tomorrow make up Stadium's educational lineup as of 2019. This has been discontinued since.

Notable on-air staff
Michael Kim

Affiliates

References

External links 
 

College basketball on television in the United States
College football on television
Television channels and stations established in 2017
Stadium (sports network)
Sports television networks in the United States
Internet television channels
Sinclair Broadcast Group